The American University of the Caribbean (AUC) in Les Cayes, Haiti, was founded and incorporated in 1983 as a not-for-profit institution organized exclusively for educational and scientific purposes. It is incorporated in the State of Florida, recognized by, and licensed with, the “Ministère de l’Education Nationale et de la Formation Professionelle de la République d’Haïti.”

The university opened its doors and began programs of instruction in 1986 at Rue Antoine Simon in Les Cayes—a peaceful, developing city with exceptional resources and an industrious local population which welcomes the university.

In 1989, the university moved to its present site, the Pierre Toussaint Campus, Charpentier, and into a spacious  building, the construction of which was funded by the American Schools and Hospitals Abroad (ASHA).

The university is a developing institution that offers programs and degrees based on the articulated needs of the people of Haiti. As the institution grows and develops, it will change not only in physical appearance but also in programs and degrees offered.

References

External links
 American University of the Caribbean/homepage

Universities in Haiti
Buildings and structures in Les Cayes
1983 establishments in Haiti
Christian universities and colleges
Educational institutions established in 1983